A 1965 memorial bust of John F. Kennedy by Jacques Lipchitz stands in the lobby of International Students House on Great Portland Street in London, England, and is visible from the outside through the glass doors. It was moved there in April 2019 from its original location on the Marylebone Road, to the west of Great Portland Street underground station, after it was vandalised in 2017.

Description and history
The bronze bust was unveiled on 15 May 1965 by the subject's brother, Robert F. Kennedy. It was originally set on a pedestal of polished black granite.

An adjacent plaque read:

It is now on a new plinth. The old plinth remains in place, and bears a sign giving directions to the new location nearby.

The bust is a unique cast, but another bust of Kennedy by Lipchitz was installed on 11 November 1965 in Military Park, Newark, New Jersey, United States.

See also

 1965 in art
 List of memorials to John F. Kennedy
 List of sculptures of presidents of the United States
 Cultural depictions of John F. Kennedy

References

External links
 

1965 establishments in England
London
Bronze sculptures in the United Kingdom
Buildings and monuments honouring American presidents in the United Kingdom
Busts in the United Kingdom
Busts of presidents of the United States
City of Westminster
Granite sculptures in the United Kingdom
London
Monuments and memorials in London
Outdoor sculptures in London
Robert F. Kennedy
Sculpture by Jacques Lipchitz
Sculptures of men in the United Kingdom
Vandalized works of art in the United Kingdom